The following is a list of massacres that have occurred in Sri Lanka and its predecessors (numbers may be approximate):

Massacres in chronological order

Notes

References

 
Massacres
Sri Lanka
Massacres
Massacres
Massacres
Massacres